Rudolph S. Comstock (August 14, 1900 – November 21, 1959) was an American football player who played eleven seasons in the National Football League, for the Canton Bulldogs, Cleveland Bulldogs, Frankford Yellow Jackets, New York Giants and Green Bay Packers. he also served as the head coach of the Pittsburgh Americans of the second American Football League.

References

1900 births
1959 deaths
American football guards
Canton Bulldogs players
Cleveland Bulldogs players
Frankford Yellow Jackets players
Georgetown Hoyas football players
Green Bay Packers players
New York Giants players
People from Pawhuska, Oklahoma
Players of American football from Oklahoma
People from Pender, Nebraska